Jerzy Rutkowski (23 April 1914 in Kiev – 18 December 1989 in Warsaw) was a Polish political activist and resistance soldier. During World War II, he joined Polish resistance (Armia Krajowa) and was the head of the underground press operation, the Tajne Wojskowe Zakłady Wydawnicze, throughout its operations, from 1940 to 1945. His son Michal Rutkowski is the Director for Human Development in the South Asia division of the World Bank.

External links 

1914 births
1989 deaths
Military personnel from Kyiv
Home Army members
Polish politicians
Politicians from Kyiv